"Wako Naam Fakir" is a song from the soundtrack of the 2019 film The Fakir of Venice. It was composed by Indian musician A. R. Rahman.

Background 
A. R. Rahman says it was the director's idea to use the 15th-century Indian mystic poet Kabir's doha, "Had-Had Tape So Auliya", that made him greenlight the song. "Anand is an interesting filmmaker and I liked his ideas. Wako Naam Fakir is a soulful number. I have composed one track for the film as well," stated the singer-composer.

The song was composed and sung by Rahman. "Wako Naam Fakir" is a doha of Sant Kabir. The song gives us a glimpse of its central characters' journey in the film. The song was performed by Rahman, Arjun Chandy, Abhay Jodhpurkar.

Personnel 
 Guitars: Keba Jeremiah
 Cello: Irina Solinas 
 Additional programming: Jerry Vincent, Ishaan Chhabra. 
 Sound engineers: Panchathan Record Inn, Chennai Suresh Permal, Karthik Sekaran
 AR Studios Mumbai
 Dilshaad Shaikh, R Nitish Kumar
 AM Studios, Chennai S.Sivakumar, Pradeep Menon, Kannan Ganpat, Krishnan Subramanian, Manoj Rama
 Mixing: Jerry Vincent
 Mastering: Suresh Permal MFiT : S Sivakumar
 Musician co-ordinators: Noell James, TM Faizuddin, Abdul Haiyum, Siddique
 Musician fixer: R Samidurai
 Video editor: Saheb Bagchi Wako Naam Fakir

References 

2019 songs
Indian music